Paddy O'Hara (born 20 July 1938) is an Irish cricket umpire.  O'Hara first officiated a match of note in the 1994 ICC Trophy between Canada and Singapore.  He stood in 15 matches during that tournament.  O'Hara later stood in his first first-class match in 1997 between Ireland and Scotland, standing in the same fixture two years later.  These remain the only first-class matches he has stood in as an on-field umpire.  It was also in 1999 that O'Hara officiated in his first List A match between Ireland and Essex in the 1999 NatWest Trophy.  He later stood in two further List A fixtures involving matches between Cheshire and Lincolnshire and the Worcestershire Cricket Board and Cumberland in the 2000 NatWest Trophy and 2001 Cheltenham & Gloucester Trophy respectively.

O'Hara is currently an umpire manager on the ICC Europe Umpires Panel.

References

External links
Paddy O'Hara at CricketArchive

1938 births
Living people
Cricketers from Belfast
Irish cricket umpires